WCTR (1530 kHz is a commercial AM radio station licensed to Chestertown, Maryland, and serving Kent and Queen Anne's counties in Maryland.  It broadcasts a classic hits radio format and is owned and operated by Hometown Multimedia, LLC.  The radio studios and offices are on Flatland Road in Chestertown.

WCTR is a daytimer station.  It is powered at 1,000 watts (270 watts during critical hours).  But 1530 AM is a clear channel frequency reserved for Class A stations KFBK Sacramento and WCKY Cincinnati.  So at night, WCTR's AM transmitter must go off the air.  Programming is heard around the clock on two FM translators:  106.9 W295CJ in Chestertown and 96.1 W241AO in Wye Mills.

Translators
In addition to the main station, WCTR is relayed by two FM translators to widen its broadcast area.

References

External links
 FM 106.9 and 96.1 and AM 1530 WCTR Online

Chestertown, Maryland
CTR (AM)
Radio stations established in 1963
1963 establishments in Maryland
CTR